Megablitz is an operational-level wargame that was developed by Tim Gow (with the assistance of Bob Cordery) to fill a niche in the range of wargames that was currently available.
It combines aspects of both traditional figure wargames and map-based wargames, and new players can quickly pick up the main concepts.

Origins
The origins of Megablitz lie in Chris Kemp's NQM (Not Quite Mechanised) wargames rules, where individual playing pieces represented company-sized units. In Megablitz these individual playing pieces usually represent battalion and regimental-sized units, although reconnaissance units are company-sized. Units are allocated Strength Points (SP) which relate to each unit's type e.g. Infantry, Cavalry, Armour, strength, equipment, and level of training. Hidden Strength Point markers are attached to the back of each stand, and are changed by a commander when the unit loses Strength Points as a result of combat.

Ground and Figure Scales
The ground scale used is very large (1:25,000 in games using 20 mm scale figures and vehicles and 1:50,000 in games using 1:300th scale figures and vehicles) and each game move represents two hours of actual time. This means that large battles (such as Kursk) can be fought out on the tabletop in a day of real time.

Giving Orders
At the beginning of each move, commanders give their units orders. This is done using the SMART order chits system.

S = Static
M = Mobile
A = Attack
R = Retreat
T = Transit

Each order determines the maximum distance a unit can move during a two-hour move as well as determining its ability to fight enemy units. For example, a unit must spend at least one move 'Static' (e.g. not moving so that it can prepare) before it can mount an 'Attack'. If a 'Mobile' unit runs into an enemy unit that is 'Static', the 'Mobile' unit will probably 'bounce off' having suffered some casualties and after inflicting very few.

The Combat System
The main element of the Megablitz combat system is the Combat Matrix. The Combat Matrix reflects the fact that units suffer different levels of casualties depending upon the orders they are carrying out. It works as follows:

Once units of opposing sides become involved in combat, each player counts the number of Strength Points that their units have.
They then pass one die for each of these Strength Points to their opponent.
Each player then rolls the die that they have been given in their Combat Box (a small box with a lid that can be fixed so that opposing players can not see the scores on the rolled dice), and the results are read off the Combat Matrix. The Combat Matrix shows the dice score required to inflict a casualty.
Each player then adjusts their units' Strength Points accordingly.

The main advantages of this system are that it is quick to use and it keeps the effects of combat secret from the opposition.

External links
Megablitz website

Miniature wargames